Cordieria is a genus of sea snails, marine gastropod mollusks in the family Borsoniidae.

This genus is considered by the French malacologist Maurice Cossmann separate from Borsonia, not on the basis of the columellar plaits alone, but mostly because of the shorter siphonal canal and a number of other characteristics that he enumerates.

Species
Species within the genus Borsonia include:
 † Cordieria fuscoamnica Darragh, 2017 
 Cordieria horrida Monterosato, 1884 
 † Cordieria iberica Rouault, 1848 
 Cordieria ovalis P. Marshall, 1917
 Cordieria pupoides Monterosato, 1884 
 Cordieria rouaultii (Dall, 1889)
 † Cordieria torquata Darragh, 2017 
 Species brought into synonymy
 Cordieria cordieri var. hispida Monterosato, 1890: synonym of Raphitoma hispidella Riccardo Giannuzzi-Savelli, Francesco Pusateri, Stefano Bartolini, 2019
 † Cordieria haasti Finlay, 1930: synonym of † Cordieria rudis (Hutton, 1885)
 † Cordieria verrucosa Finlay, 1930: synonym of † Cordieria rudis (Hutton, 1885)

References

 Grant & Gale, Pliocene and Pleistocene Mollusca of California and adjacent regions;  Memoirs of the San Diego Society of Natural History 1 (1931) p. 543
 Monterosato, A. T., 1884 Nomenclatura generica e specifica di alcune Conchiglie Mediterranee, p. 152 pp

External links
  Bouchet P., Kantor Yu.I., Sysoev A. & Puillandre N. (2011) A new operational classification of the Conoidea. Journal of Molluscan Studies 77: 273-308.
 Riccardo Giannuzzi-Savelli, Francesco Pusateri, Stefano Bartolini; A revision of the Mediterranean Raphitomidae, 8: on twopoorly known species of Raphitoma Bellardi, 1847: R. pumila (Monterosato, 1890) and R. hispidella nomen novum (Gastropoda Conoidea); Biodiversity Journal, 2019

 
Gastropod genera